Cariboo Country is a Canadian television series which aired on CBC Television between July 2, 1960 and September 1960, then between 1964 and 1967.

Plot 

Cariboo Country was about Smith (Hughes), whose first name was unknown, his wife Norah (Carlson) and their son, Sherwood (Davies, Cherrier). A family from the fictional town of Namko, British Columbia, struggling to operate a small ranch in central British Columbia.

Production 

 The series was first aired locally in Vancouver then nationally throughout Canada. The series was cancelled after its first season but returned in 1964, with a larger budget, until 1967.

External links 
 Cariboo Country at the Canadian Communications Foundation
 

1960 Canadian television series debuts
1960 Canadian television series endings
1964 Canadian television series debuts
1967 Canadian television series endings
1960s Canadian drama television series
Black-and-white Canadian television shows
CBC Television original programming
Television shows filmed in Vancouver
Television shows set in Vancouver